Bongo Logic is an American charanga founded in Los Angeles in 1987 under the leadership of timbalero Brett Gollin. Other personnel include flautist Art Webb, violinist Harry Scorzo, bassist Guillermo Guzmán, güiro player Johnny Crespo, conga player Michito Sánchez, keyboardist John Douglas and pianist Joe Rotondi. They have recorded for Rhythm Safari and Montuno Records, respectively. The original members have changed since they first began, and include newer members like Alfredo Ortiz, John Fumo, Claude Caillet, and many others.

Discography
Cha Cha Charanga on Rocky Peak, 1987
¡Despierta! on Rhythm Safari/Priority, 1991
Bongo-Licious on Montuno Records 1993
Tipiqueros on Montuno Records  1996
Charanga-rama on Montuno Records 1999

References

Afro-Cuban jazz ensembles
Cuban charanga
Musical groups from Los Angeles
Musical groups established in 1987